Christian Vision is a working group of the Coordination Council of Belarus for formulating and supporting Christians’ contribution to the council's aims: overcoming the political crisis and securing reconciliation.

Status and membership 
The group was established on 9 September 2020 as an informal interdenominational association open to the Coordination Council members to join. The statement announcing the group's establishment was initially signed by 24 lay and ordained persons from the main Christian denominations of Belarus.

Activities 
Christian Vision monitors and publicises the facts of persecution of the people of faith based on their believes or political views, and of violence and infringement of their rights in the place of detention. Those reports form the basis of the ongoing Monitoring of the Persecution in Belarus of People on Religious Grounds During the Political Crisis published in Russian and English. The reports have been used by the national and international media outlets for their own reporting.

The group mobilised and reported on the words and works of the laity and clergy in support of nonviolence, restoring the rule of law and releasing political prisoners.

The group encouraged theologians, ordained ministers and others in Belarus and abroad to develop a theological reflective perspective on the protests and persecutions in Belarus. An unprecedented for Belarus example of such a reflection was Sviatlana Tsikhanouskaya's letter to the Pope Francis.

It organised and supported campaigns for political prisoners, persecuted believers and religious communities in Belarus.

The group publicises its work on its website and the channels in Telegram and Facebook.

External links 

 The Christian Vision's website, Church and the Political Crisis in Belarus

References 

2020–2021 Belarusian protests
Belarusian opposition
Protests in Belarus
Human rights organizations based in Belarus
Christian organisations in Belarus